Palakkodu railway station is a railway station situated in Palakkodu, a panchayat town and taluk headquarters located in the Dharmapuri district of Tamil Nadu.

Administration
It has been administered by the South Western Railway Zone, included in the Bangalore railway division that was transferred over from the Southern Railway zone.

Location and layout
The station falls on the  Dharmapuri–Hosur state highway section. It has one platform.

Facilities
The station is equipped with a real-time online reservation facility. Many people warm up here during early mornings and evenings every day.

References

Bangalore railway division
Railway stations in Dharmapuri district